The Equestrian Individual Championship Test Grade II event at the 2008 Summer Paralympics was held in the Hong Kong Olympic Equestrian Centre on 8 September at 07:30.

The competition was assessed by a ground jury composed of five judges placed at locations designated E, H, C, M, and B. Each judge rated the competitors' performances with a percentage score. The five scores from the jury were then averaged to determine a rider's total percentage score.

The event was won by Britta Naepel, representing .

Ground jury

Results 
T = Team Member (see Equestrian at the 2008 Summer Paralympics – Team).

References

Equestrian at the 2008 Summer Paralympics